The Hungary cricket team toured Austria from 4 to 5 June 2022, to play a three-match Twenty20 International (T20I) bilateral series against hosts Austria. The venue for all of the matches was Seebarn Cricket Ground. The series provided both teams with preparation for the 2022–23 ICC Men's T20 World Cup Europe Qualifier subregional tournaments. The series finished 1–1 with Austria winning the first game by 105 runs, the second game ending in a no result, and Hungary winning the final match by 4 wickets.

Squads

T20I series

1st T20I

2nd T20I

3rd T20I

References

External links
 Series home at ESPN Cricinfo

Associate international cricket competitions in 2022